Zayn ad-Din (also transliterated as Zinedine, Zeyneddin, Zain-ud-Din, Zainuddin,  Zainaddin, etc.) is an Arabic name meaning "grace of the religion" and may refer to:

People

Given name
 Zayn al-Din Ali Kutchek (died 1168): son of Begtakin, Atabeg of Erbil and father of Muzaffar al-din Gokbori
 Zayn al-Din al-Amidi (died 1312), blind Iraqi scholar who invented a method for the blind to read
 Zayn al-Din Azraqi: Abul-Mahāsin Abu Bakr Zaynuddin Azraqi, or just Azraqi (died 1072), Persian poet
 Al-Ashraf Zein al-Din Abu al-Ma'ali ibn Shaban, or just Al-Ashraf Sha'ban (died 1377), Mamluk Sultan of Egypt
 Zainuddin, 15th-century Bengali poet
 Zainuddin bin Maidin (born 1939), Malaysian politician
 Zinedine Ferhat (born 1993), Algerian footballer
 Zayn al-Din Gorgani (1040–1136), Persian court physician
 Al-Salih Salah Zein al-Din Hajji II, or just Al-Salih Hajji (died c. 1389), Mamluk Sultan of Egypt
 Zayn al-Din al-Juba'i al'Amili (1506–1558), Shi'ite cleric and martyr
 Zayn al-Din Kitbugha: Al-Malik al-Adil Zayn-ad-Din Kitbugha Ben Abd-Allah al-Mansuri al-Turki al-Mughli, or just Al-Adil Kitbugha (died 1297), Mamluk Sultan of Egypt
 Zainuddin Makhdoom II (died 1583), Indian Islamic lawyer and author
 Sheikh Zainuddin, Bengali artist who rose to prominence during the British Raj
 Zineddine Mekkaoui (born 1987), Algerian footballer
 Zain al-Din Muhammad Abdul Hady, or just Zain Abdul Hady (born 1956), Egyptian information scientist and novelist
 Zainudin Nordin (born 1963), Singaporean politician
 Zine Eddine Sekhri, Algerian Paralympian athlete
 Zainuddin Shirazi (c. 1302 – c. 1370), Indian Sufi saint
 Zinedine Soualem (born 1957), French film actor
 Zaynitdin Tadjiyev (born 1977), Uzbek footballer
 Zinedine Zidane (born 1972), French footballer and manager
 Mohammad Ebrahim Zainuddin 'Ebbu' Ghazali, or just Mohammed Ghazali (1924–2003), Pakistani cricketer
 Qari Zainuddin Mehsud, or Qari Zain, Pakistani Taliban leader

Surname
 A. C. Zainuddin (1952–1999), Indian actor in Malayalam film
 Bakhtiyar Zaynutdinov (born 1998), Kazakhstani footballer
 Daim Zainuddin (born 1938), Malaysian economist and politician
 Hamzah Zainuddin (born 1957), Malaysian politician
 Mohamed Alí Seineldín (1933–2009), Argentine army colonel
 Nazira Zain al-Din (born 1908), Druze Lebanese scholar and women's rights activist
 Raya Zeineddine (born 1988), Syrian sports shooter

Places
 Zeynəddin, village and municipality in the Babek Rayon of Nakhchivan, Azerbaijan
 Aşağı Zeynəddin, village and municipality in the Agdash Rayon of Azerbaijan
 Yuxarı Zeynəddin, village and municipality in the Agdash Rayon of Azerbaijan
 Zeyn ol Din, Fars, Iran
 Zeyn ol Din, Kermanshah, Iran
 Zeyn ol Din, Razavi Khorasan, Iran
 Zeinodin Caravanserai, located at Zein-o-din, Yazd, Iran

See also
 Zeyn ol Dini, Lamerd, Fars Province, Iran